The 1961–62 international cricket season was from September 1961 to April 1962.

Season overview

October

New Zealand in Australia

England in Pakistan

November

England in India

December

New Zealand in South Africa

January

Ceylon in India

February

India in the West Indies

MCC in Ceylon

March

International XI in India

References

International cricket competitions by season
1961 in cricket
1962 in cricket